Statistics of League of Ireland in the 1953/54 season.

Overview
It was contested by 12 teams, and Shamrock Rovers won the championship.

Final classification

Results

Top scorers

Ireland
1953–54 in Republic of Ireland association football
League of Ireland seasons